The following is a list of films produced in the Kannada film industry in India in 1986, presented in alphabetical order.

See also 
Kannada films of 1985
Kannada films of 1987

References 

1986
Kannada
Films, Kannada